Albert Donnel Williams (born September 7, 1964) is a former American professional football player who was a linebacker in the National Football League (NFL) and the World League of American Football (WLAF). He played for the Pittsburgh Steelers of the NFL, and the San Antonio Riders of the WLAF. Williams played collegiately at the University of Texas at El Paso (UTEP).

References

1964 births
Living people
American football linebackers
Players of American football from San Antonio
Pittsburgh Steelers players
Players of American football from Virginia
UTEP Miners football players